Doctor Who: Greatest Monsters & Villains is a BBC countdown of Doctor Who ten most popular monsters and villains as voted for by viewers, presented by Joel Dommett to commemorate the 50th anniversary of the long running sci-fi drama.  The compilations looks at antagonists that have featured in one of the revived series. Later that episode is played in full, and the show shows clips from the classic series.

Episode list

References

External links

Works about Doctor Who
2010s British science fiction television series
2013 British television series debuts
British science fiction television shows
Doctor Who spin-offs
English-language television shows